The combat of Dourados or Combat of the Military Colony of Dourados was a confrontation between a Brazilian garrison of fifteen men and a Paraguayan column with 3,500 soldiers, fought on December 29, 1864, in the current city of Antônio João, Mato Grosso do Sul , during the Paraguayan War. In the context of the Mato Grosso Campaign, the Paraguayan invading army started to conquer the Military Colony of Dourados, south of the then Province of Mato Grosso. There was a single garrison to defend it, under the command of Lieutenant Antônio João Ribeiro. The Paraguayan would have offered the opportunity to surrender, however, the Brazilian commander refused the proposal. I would accept it if it came from the imperial government. Supposedly I would have said in reply: "I know I am dying, but my blood and that of my companions will serve as a solemn protest against the invasion of the soil of my homeland." In the combat the lieutenant and all his fourteen commanded died, with the Paraguayans later occupying the military colony.

References

Colônia Militar dos Dourados
Colônia Militar dos Dourados
Colônia Militar dos Dourados
Colônia Militar dos Dourados
December 1864 events
History of Mato Grosso do Sul